Kiyovu Sports Association, more commonly known as S.C. Kiyovu Sports, Kiyovu Sports or Kiyovu, is an association football club based in Kigali, Rwanda. The team currently competes in the Rwanda National Football League, and plays its home games at Mumena Stadium or Amahoro Stadium. The club's reserve team currently competes in the Rwandan Third Division. The club has won seven league titles, three trophies, and one super cup, and was the only Rwandan club to go a whole season unbeaten in 1990.

Kiyovu Sport Club was the first Rwanda football team to join the Football League, between 1948 and 1957. They started in the first division and were relegated only once, in 2017.

Champions 7
1968: kiyovu sports (kigali)
1970: Kiyovu sports(Kigali)

1983: Kiyovu Sports (Kigali)
1989:kiyovu Sports (Kigali)
1990:Kiyovu sports (Kigali)
1992: Kiyovu Sports (Kigali)
1993: Kiyovu Sports (Kigali)

Trophies 3

1977: Kiyovu Sports
1984: Kiyovu Sports (Kiyovu 3-0 Eclair)
1985: Kiyovu Sports  (Kiyovu 2-1 Etincelle)
2022:Made in Rwanda cup (kiyovu 2-1Rayon sport)

Super Cup 2
1987:kiyovu sports (kiyovu sport fc 2-0 panthére fc)
1992: Kiyovu Sports (Kiyovu Sport FC 2-1 Rayon Sport FC)

Peace Cup Finalist

1995: Kiyovu Sport vs APR FC (APR FC)
1996: Kiyovu Sport vs APR FC (APR FC)
1997: Kiyovu Sport vs RWANDA FC (RWANDA FC)
2019: Kiyovu Sport vs A.S Kigali

Current squad (2021–22)

Current technical staff

References 

Kiyovu Sport
Association football clubs established in 1964
1964 establishments in Rwanda